Basta guardarla (Just Look at Her) is a 1970 Italian comedy film directed by Luciano Salce.

Plot 
Enrichetta, a young peasant girl who lives in the village of Copparola di Sotto, Ciociaria, joins the avanspettacolo company of Silver Boy as a dancer. She will face the jealousy of the soubrette Marisa do Sol and the perils of love.

Cast 

 Maria Grazia Buccella as Enrichetta 
 Carlo Giuffré as Silver Boy 
 Mariangela Melato as Marisa do Sol
 Spiros Focás as Fernando 
 Pippo Franco as Danilo 
 Franca Valeri as Pola Prima
 Luciano Salce as Farfarello
 Riccardo Garrone as  Pelliconi  
 Ettore Mattia 
 Umberto D'Orsi 	
 Mino Guerrini 		
 Loredana Bertè 		
 Ennio Antonelli

References

External links

Basta guardarla at Variety Distribution

1970 films
Italian comedy films
1970 comedy films
Films directed by Luciano Salce
Films about theatre
Films scored by Franco Pisano
1970s Italian-language films
1970s Italian films